Nawfija, also written as Nọfịja (pronounced Lọvụjọ by natives), is an Igbo town located in southeastern Nigeria. It is under Orumba South Local Government Area council in Anambra State. As at 2006, Nawfija had an estimated population of 100,000.

Villages 
Nawfija is made up seven major villages namely: Amọkwụ, Ezeome, Ọhụkabịa, Ụmụọwahịa, Ụmụezeiyi, Ụmụezeọgbụ, and Ụmụọma. Administratively, each village is led by an executive chairman.

Landmark 
Nawfija is serviced by a number of amenities such as a healthcare center, a secondary and primary school, and a number of Anglican and Catholic Churches. The town is home to very industrious, successful and educated Nigerians who can be found in various places across Nigeria and the world. The former Executive Director of Engineering Services, Federal Airports Authority of Nigeria, Engr. Lawrence Adimonye hails from Amokwu, Nawfija.

References 

Populated places in Anambra State